The Stackpole Estate is located between the villages of Stackpole and Bosherston in Pembrokeshire, Wales, within the Pembrokeshire Coast National Park. It is situated within the community of Stackpole and Castlemartin.

It is owned and maintained by the National Trust.

History

Stackpole Court, a mansion, was built just outside the village of Stackpole. During the English Civil War, the Lort family, who owned the estate from 1611 to 1698, took the side of the King, and the house was besieged by Parliamentarians, to whom they eventually surrendered. When Sir Gilbert Lort died in 1698 the estate passed to his sister Elizabeth who had married Sir Alexander Campbell, Thane of Cawdor, in 1689. She outlived her husband, and on her death in 1714 the estate passed to her son John Campbell.

A new mansion constructed of limestone was built in later years with extensive gardens, greenhouses and fine collections of plants. Much of the Stackpole Estate farmland was requisitioned at the start of World War II to create a training ground for British troops. Castlemartin Training Area range still occupies this land. This made the estate unviable and The Cawdors returned to their Scottish estate in Nairnshire in the early 1940s. Crippling taxes on the empty mansion meant it was demolished in 1963, leaving behind the estate's outbuildings, parkland and beaches which are looked after by the National Trust and enjoyed by the public today. The is designated Grade I on the Cadw/ICOMOS Register of Parks and Gardens of Special Historic Interest in Wales. The  of lakes, which are today known as the Lily Ponds, were created by the damming of the three narrow limestone valleys in 1780 and 1860 by the Cawdor family.

Etymology

Before the 17th century, the name was recorded in English as Stacpole, Stakepole and Stacpoll. The name is made of two Welsh topographical elements, 'Stac-' (isolated columnar rock) and '-pwll' (a pool). The "stac" in the name is said to be that of Stack rock, at the mouth of Broad Haven South which may have marked the entrance to an ancient waterway, suitable as a harbour.

Geography and ecology

The Stackpole Estate contains the beaches of Barafundle Bay and Broad Haven South. The  of lakes are home to Eurasian otter, goosander, gadwall and kingfisher. From the cliff tops and beaches, bottlenose dolphin and basking shark can sometimes be seen along with species of seabird such as kittiwakes and red-billed choughs. The Stackpole estate is contains one of the largest colonies in Britain of the greater horseshoe bat.

Stackpole village

It has its own voluntary controlled primary school for children aged 4 to 11. The school was constructed in the late nineteenth century.

Stackpole village was moved from its original medieval site in 1735 to accommodate the growing Stackpole Estate. However, present day Stackpole is considerably larger than it was then. Stackpole has a public house, The Stackpole Inn, which occupies the former village Post Office, a building of sixteenth-century origin. The village is surrounded on all sides by woodland and arable farmland.

During the 1950s and 1960s, the village expanded with modern homes built at the edge of Deer Park and around the school.

Just outside the village there is the Stackpole Outdoor Learning Centre which is a multi-purpose venue run by the National Trust with a theatre, licensed bar and conference facilities. It is immediately adjacent to the Lily Ponds and the Eight-Arch Bridge and occupies a remarkably tranquil part of the estate near Home Farm and less than a  walk from Broad Haven South beach.

Stackpole Elidor church 
 
St Elidyr's Church, Stackpole is dedicated to St. James and St Elidyr, and goes back to the thirteenth century. It lies at the bottom of a quiet wooded valley with just three small cottages and the rectory in the immediate vicinity. The layout of the church is in the traditional cruciform shape, aligned east to west, with a chancel and nave flanked by two transepts. The tall, slender tower is undoubtedly the oldest part of the present structure, dating back probably to the thirteenth or late twelfth century. It is of the typical South Pembrokeshire form (see Little England Beyond Wales).

It appears that by 1851 the state of the fabric of the church made a complete restoration essential, although the building had been carefully maintained until only a few years before. Richard Fenton, in his Historical Tour through Pembrokeshire published in 1810, quotes from a letter written by Stephen Davies, Canon of St. Davids Cathedral, to the antiquary Browne Willis:

In 1807 the church wardens stated that the church was in good repair, but by 1828 they declared that the fabric, though in good repair, was very damp, and by 1848 it was recorded that "not one casement opens".

In 1851 John Frederick Campbell, 1st Earl Cawdor, engaged Sir George Gilbert Scott, the most respected English church architect of the day, to direct the work of restoration. He employed a Cardiff builder, WP James, and the work cost a total of "£1,804 7s 2½d" which adjusted for 2010 would be £105,609.09.

The result is the typical sound, workmanlike building that Scott produced in his renovations, with a tall, narrow chancel arch, colourful Minton tiles on the chancel floor and sanctuary walls, and the Middle English or Decorated style of tracery in the main windows. The transepts retain their fourteenth century vaulting, and the Lort chapel its rib vaulting. There were originally matching hagioscopes on each side of the chancel arch, though the north squint was later blocked by the organ installed in 1874. In the south transept there is a small piscina, probably of the fourteenth century, indicating that there may have been a side altar.

References

Further reading
Davies, John E. The Changing Fortunes of a British Aristocratic Family: The Campbells of Cawdor and their Welsh Estates, 1689–1976. The Boydell Press,

External links
Stackpole Estate information at the National Trust
Historical information and sources on GENUKI

National Trust properties in Wales
Geography of Pembrokeshire
Welsh coast and countryside
Nature reserves in Pembrokeshire
Tourist attractions in Pembrokeshire
Villages in Pembrokeshire
Coast of Pembrokeshire
Registered historic parks and gardens in Pembrokeshire